Vuja De may mean:

 Vuja de, something familiar viewed with a fresh view
 The Dream (The Orb album), music single